The Heins Block is the most prominent commercial building in the city of Olivia, Minnesota, United States.  It was built in 1896 to house a bank and a hardware store owned by P.W. Heins.  P.W. Heins opened up his first mercantile store soon after the village of Olivia was surveyed by the Hastings and Dakota Railway.  Heins established the Peoples Bank in 1889.

The architect, A.J. Hedlund, designed a Queen Anne-styled house for Heins.  After the house was designed, Heins commissioned Hedlund to design a building for the Peoples Bank.  The building was completed in 1896 and housed the bank and the Heins and Byers Hardware Store on the first level, with offices and apartments on the second and third levels.  It has Romanesque details such as arched window openings, as well as a recessed Roman arched entrance resting above two short columns.

References

Buildings and structures in Renville County, Minnesota
Commercial buildings on the National Register of Historic Places in Minnesota
Commercial buildings completed in 1896
Queen Anne architecture in Minnesota
National Register of Historic Places in Renville County, Minnesota